Prunus turneriana is a species of Prunus native to Papua New Guinea and Australia. Its common names include almondbark, wild almond, and joonda. The name almondbark refers to the odor of almonds emitted when the bark is cut. A late successional rainforest tree, it reaches 30m. The fruit is relished by cassowaries.

References

turneriana
Flora of Papua New Guinea
Flora of Australia
Plants described in 1965